Kalkito may refer to:

 "Kalkito", pseudonym of the electronic musician Paul Kalkbrenner
 Kalkitos, a subset of Action Transfers, which are a type of art-based children's pastime